Zarina Bhimji (born 1963) is a Ugandan Indian photographer, based in London. She was nominated for the Turner Prize in 2007, exhibited at Documenta 11 in 2002, and is represented in the public collections of Tate, the Museum of Contemporary Art in Chicago and Moderna Museet in Stockholm.

Life and work
Born in Mbarara, Uganda, Bhimji was educated at Leicester Polytechnic (1982–1983), Goldsmiths' College (1983–1986) and Slade School of Fine Art, University College London (1987–1989). Her work appeared in Creative Camera in April 1990, and in a landmark issue of Ten.8 magazine as early as 1992.

In 2001, Bhimji had her first solo exhibition in the U.S., Cleaning the Garden, at Talwar Gallery, New York and won the EAST award at EASTinternational selected by Mary Kelly and Peter Wollen.

She participated in documenta 11 in June to September 2002 with her 16 mm film.

From 2003 to 2007, she travelled widely in India, East Africa and Zanzibar, studying legal documents and the stories of those who formed British power in those countries, carrying out interviews and taking photographs.

In 2003 Bhimji received the International Center for Photography's, Infinity Award in the Art Photography category.

In 2007, she was shortlisted for the Turner Prize for photographs of Uganda. Their theme was the expulsion of Asians from the country by Idi Amin and the subsequent loss and grief caused. The photographs were exhibited at Haunch of Venison gallery in London and Zurich. Her Turner Prize display included a film, Waiting, which was shot in a sisal-processing factory.

The Tate gallery describes her work:In 2012, the first major survey exhibition of her work was held at Whitechapel Gallery, London, January–March 2012, which traced 25 years of her work. It opened with the joint premiere of her film, Yellow Patch (2011), at The New Art Gallery Walsall and the Whitechapel Gallery. The film was inspired by trade and migration across the Indian Ocean. An accompanying monograph was published by Ridinghouse.

Consisting of over 100 unframed photographs and multiple embroideries, Lead White is a meditation on power and beauty. It is the culmination of a decade-long investigation conducted over multiple continents, delving into national archives to capture details of words, lines, stamps and embossing. Bhimji creates poetic narratives by editing and repeating these details, as if constructing a musical composition, to explore what archives do, how they categorise and how they reveal institutional ideologies. The work also combines digital and physical crafts – including the use of embroidery for the first time in Bhimji’s practice – drawing attention to textures and traces, light and shadow. Her latest work, Lead White has been commissioned by Sharjah Art Foundation. Lead White was exhibited at Tate Britain in 2018/19.

Exhibitions

Solo exhibitions 

 1992: Zarina Bhimji: I Will Always Be Here, Ikon Gallery, Birmingham
 1995: Zarina Bhimji, Kettle's Yard, Cambridge (introduction by Marina Warner)
 1998: Cleaning the Garden, Harewood House, Terrace Gallery, Leeds
 2006: Zarina Bhimji, Haunch of Venison, London
 2007: Zarina Bhimji, Haunch of Venison, Zurich
 2009: Zarina Bhimji, Out of Blue, Art Institute of Chicago, Chicago, USA
 2010: Who Knows Tomorrow, Hamburger Bahnhof, Berlin, Germany
 2012: Zarina Bhimji, Whitechapel Gallery, London and Kunstmuseum Bern, Switzerland
 2018: Lead White, Tate Britain

Group exhibitions 

 1985: f.stops, Chelsea School of Art, London
 1985: Mirror Reflecting Darkly, Brixton Art Gallery, London
 1986: Darshan: An Exhibition by Ten Asian Photographers, Camerawork, London
 1986: From Two Worlds, Whitechapel Art Gallery, London
 1986: Jagrati, Greenwich Citizens Gallery, London
 1987: The Image Employed: the Use of Narrative in Black Art, Cornerhouse, Manchester
 1987: Polareyes, Camden Arts Centre, London
 1987: The Devils Feast, Chelsea School of Art, London
 1987: Dislocations, Kettle's Yard, Cambridge
 1988: Spectrums Women's Photography Festival Open Exhibition, South London Gallery
 1988: The Essential Black Art, Chisenhale Gallery, London and UK tour
 1989: Fabled Territories, City Art Gallery, Leeds (toured)
 1989: Intimate Distance, the Photographers' Gallery, London
 1990: In Focus, Horizon Gallery, London
 1990: Passing Glances: Works by 5 Artists Presented by Artangel in Collaboration with the British Library, British Library, Euston Road, London
 1990: The Women in My Life, the Small Mansions Arts Centre, London
 1991: Shocks to the System: Social and Political Issues in Recent British Art from the Arts Council Collection, South Bank Centre, London (toured)
 1993: On Taking a Normal Situation, Museum van Hedendaagse Kunst, Antwerpen
 1994: Iniva inauguration exhibition, Iniva London
 1995: The Impossible Science of Being, the Photographers' Gallery, London
 1996: In/Sight, Guggenheim Museum, New York
 1997: No place (like home), Walker Arts Centre, Minneapolis
 2002: Documenta 11, Kassel
 2003: Istanbul Biennale, Istanbul
 2005: British Art Show 6, Baltic Centre for Contemporary Art, Gateshead and UK tour

Collections
Bhimji's work is held in the following public collections:

 Tate
 Museum of Contemporary Art in Chicago
 Moderna Museet in Stockholm

References

External links
 

1963 births
Living people
Ugandan people of Indian descent
British Ismailis
Alumni of De Montfort University
Alumni of the Slade School of Fine Art
Alumni of Goldsmiths, University of London
Ugandan women artists
English women photographers
Journalists from London
Ugandan emigrants to the United Kingdom
People from Mbarara
Gujarati people
Khoja Ismailism